Schröckingerite is a radioactive yellow uranium-containing carbonate mineral, hydrated sodium calcium uranyl sulfate carbonate fluoride.  Schröckingerite crystallizes in the orthorhombic system, occurring as globular clusters, and fluoresces yellow-green under ultraviolet light.

Schröckingerite was first described in 1783 from an occurrence in Jáchymov, Bohemia, Czech Republic, and named for its discoverer, Julius Freiherr Schröckinger von Neudenberg (1814–1882).

References

Uranium(VI) minerals
Carbonate minerals
Sulfate minerals
Triclinic minerals
Minerals in space group 2